Kadriye is a Turkish given name. Notable people with the name include:

 Kadriye Gökçek, Turkish football referee
 Kadria Hussein (1888–1955), Egyptian royal and writer
 Kadriye Nurmambet (born 1933), Dobrujan-born Crimean Tatar traditional folk singer and folklorist
 Kadriye Selimoğlu (born 1978), Turkish taekwondo practitioner

See also
 Kadriye, a township in Serik district of Antalya Province, Turkey

Turkish feminine given names